Diaphus chrysorhynchus, the golden-nose lantern fish, is a species of lanternfish 
found in the Pacific Ocean.

Size

References

Myctophidae
Taxa named by Charles Henry Gilbert
Taxa named by Frank Cramer
Fish described in 1897